Fotua is a settlement on Foa island, Tonga. It had a population of 259 in 2016.

References

Populated places in Tonga
Haʻapai